The Prix citron is an award given annually by the French Magazine L'Équipe to the Tour de France rider voted least likeable or least co-operative with the press. The Award is a semi-serious rebuke by international cycling journalists to the professionals they cover. It is announced together with the newer Prix orange, given to the rider(s) voted most likeable or most co-operative by journalists.

Origins
At the conclusion of every Tour the prize is announced by France's largest sporting magazine, L'Équipe. Two Lemons and Two Oranges are awarded, to one French and Non-French cyclist apiece. Votes are solicited by the magazine to cycling journalists around the world.

The Tour de France is well-known for its numerous official and semi-official prizes, with the Prix citron falling among the latter. It stands alongside similar tongue-in-cheek prizes like the Lanterne Rouge (awarded to each stage's slowest rider), and the Top Banana (awarded daily by "Rouleur" magazine to an "Unsung rider").

See also
 Maillot jaune
 Maillot vert
 Maillot blanc
 Maillot à pois
 Dossard rouge
 Dossard jaune
 Lanterne rouge
 Souvenir Henri Desgrange

External links
Prix orange pour Federer
Prix Citron the TdF Award that wasn't Stripped from Lance Armstrong
Prix Citron Awarded Stage 21
Rouleur Top Banana Prize

Tour de France